Topock Gorge is a mountainous canyon and gorge section of the Colorado River located between Interstate 40 and Lake Havasu.  The town of Needles, California, to the northwest, was named for the "needle-like" vertical rock outcroppings. The natural landmarks and river crossing by them were one of the journey markers for travelers on historic Route 66.

Havasu National Wildlife Refuge
The Topock Gorge is within the Havasu National Wildlife Refuge, managed by the United States Fish and Wildlife Service.  It features natural habitat, wildlife, scenic preservation, and archeology. Mojave people Indian petroglyphs are in the Gorge.

Fish species
 Rainbow
 Largemouth Bass
 Striped Bass
 Crappie
 Sunfish
 Catfish (Channel)
 Carp

Amphibians
 Bullfrogs

References

  U.S. Fish and Wildlife Service: Havasu Wilderness Area – brochure

External links
 Official Havasu National Wildlife Refuge website
 Great Blog with tons of pictures and video of the Topock Gorge
 Arizona Boating Locations Facilities Map
 Arizona Fishing Locations Map

Lower Colorado River Valley
Mojave Desert
Canyons and gorges of Arizona
Canyons and gorges of California
Rock formations of California
Landforms of Mohave County, Arizona
Landforms of San Bernardino County, California
Tourist attractions along U.S. Route 66